Sport Sciences Research Institute of Iran (SSRI) is the only national organization in charge of scientific research in the field of Physical Education and Sport Sciences. It was established in 1998 by Ministry of Science, Research and Technology. In 2011 to improve its structure the research center was promoted to research institute and moved to its new location in Tehran, Iran.

Footnotes

External links 
About the SSRI

Sports science
Sport in Iran
Sport in Mashhad
Medical and health organisations based in Iran
1998 establishments in Iran